Gabriella Mészáros (born 14 December 1913, died 4 April 1994) was a Hungarian gymnast who competed in the 1936 Summer Olympics.  Exceptionally good on beam, she was the highest scorer on balance beam on the voluntary exercise on that apparatus as well as having the highest combined (compulsory and voluntary totalled together) score on that apparatus at the 1936 Summer Olympics.  Also, at the first-ever World Championships for Women in 1934, she is credited with being the first gymnast ever to execute a split on the balance beam, during which debut, a judge arose from his/her station to observe the new feat.

References 

1913 births
1994 deaths
Hungarian female artistic gymnasts
Olympic gymnasts of Hungary
Gymnasts at the 1936 Summer Olympics
Olympic bronze medalists for Hungary
Olympic medalists in gymnastics
Medalists at the 1936 Summer Olympics
20th-century Hungarian women